The Diocese of Western Kowloon is one of the three dioceses under the Hong Kong Sheng Kung Hui. Its territory covers most of western Kowloon and the western New Territories (excluding the outlying islands of Hong Kong). All Saints' Church, then consecrated cathedral on 31 October 2010, was established in 1891, making it one of the oldest Anglican churches in Hong Kong. Incumbent bishop, Andrew Chan, was elected on 26 June 2011 and consecrated on 25 March 2012 to replace the outgoing bishop, Thomas Soo.


Churches 
The diocese oversees over 12 churches and chapels across western Kowloon and western New Territories (excluding the outlying islands of Hong Kong).

Parishes 
 All Saints' Cathedral, Mong Kok
 St. Andrew's Church, Tsim Sha Tsui
 St. Thomas' Church, Sham Shui Po
 Kei Oi Church, Cheung Sha Wan
 St. Matthias' Church, Yuen Long
 St. Peter's Church, Castle Peak
 Crown of Thorns' Church, Tsuen Wan
 St. Joseph's Church, Kam Tin
 St. Philips' Church, Tin Shui Wai
 The Church of Epiphany, Tsing Yi

Missions 
 The Church of Shalom, Sham Shui Po
 Church of the Divine Love, Kwai Chung

See also 

 Diocese of Hong Kong Island
 Diocese of Eastern Kowloon
 List of Anglican churches in Hong Kong
 Anglican Communion

References

External links 
Diocese of Western Kowloon
Hong Kong Sheng Kung Hui

Anglican Diocese of Western Kowloon
Hong Kong Sheng Kung Hui
Western Kowloon